Sigurður Kári Kristjánsson (born May 9, 1973) is an Icelandic Member of Parliament for the Independence Party (Sjálfstæðisflokkurinn).

Kristjánsson graduated with a law degree from the University of Iceland in 1998. He was chairman of The National Youth Organisation of the Independence Party (Samband ungra sjálfstæðismanna) from 1999 to 2001. He has served as Member of the Icelandic parliament Althing since the parliament elections in 2003 and as vice chairman of Heimssýn, the cross-political organisation of Icelandic Eurosceptics, since 2004.

External links
Sigurður Kári Kristjánsson (Alþingi)
sigurdurkari.is - Official website
Sjálfstæðisflokkurinn (in English)
Samband ungra sjálfstæðismanna (in English)
Heimssýn (in English)

1973 births
Living people
Sigurdur Kari Kristjansson
Sigurdur Kari Kristjansson